Marselisborg Gymnasium is a school of secondary education in Aarhus, Denmark. The school is a financially independent self-owning educational institution under the Danish state. The school offers the 3-year Matriculation examination (STX) programme within five main branches; natural sciences, social sciences, language, music and, since 2006, sports through a partnership with Team Danmark.

Marselisborg Gymnasium was founded in 1898 by Olaf Gudme under the name Marselisborg Boarding and Learned School. The school became a popular alternative to Aarhus Katedralskole and was first expanded in 1904. From 1916 the school became owned by Aarhus Municipality and in 1973 by Aarhus County. In the Danish Municipal Reform of 2007 the Danish counties were abolished and Marselisborg Gymnasium became independent and self-owning like most other Danish educational institutions.

Notable graduates 
 1942 – Tage Skou-Hansen, writer
 1957 – Jørgen Leth, writer
 1958 – Kurt Thyboe, journalist, writer
 1987 – Lars Hjortshøj, comedian
 1990 – Nicolai Wammen, politician. Mayor of Aarhus and Minister of Parliament
 2007 – Sara Petersen, athlete

References

External links
 Marselisborg Gymnasium
 Team Danmark Ungdomsuddannelse

¨

Gymnasiums in Aarhus
Educational institutions established in 1898
1898 establishments in Denmark